The 1973 Major League Baseball postseason was the playoff tournament of Major League Baseball for the 1973 season. The winners of each division advance to the postseason and face each other in a League Championship Series to determine the pennant winners that face each other in the World Series.

In the American League, the Baltimore Orioles returned to the postseason for the fourth time in the past five seasons, and the Oakland Athletics made their third straight appearance. In the National League, the Cincinnati Reds returned for the third time in the past four seasons, and the New York Mets returned for the second time in the past five seasons.

The playoffs began on October 6, 1973, and concluded on October 21, 1973, with the Athletics defeating the Mets in seven games in the 1973 World Series. The Athletics repeated as World Series champions.

Playoff seeds
The following teams qualified for the postseason:

American League
 Baltimore Orioles – AL East champions, AL best record, 97–65
 Oakland Athletics – AL West champions, 94–68

National League
 New York Mets – NL East champions, 82–79
 Cincinnati Reds – NL West champions, NL best record, MLB best record, 99–63

Playoff bracket

American League Championship Series

Baltimore Orioles vs. Oakland Athletics

This was the second postseason meeting between the Orioles and Athletics. They previously met in the 1971 ALCS, which the Orioles won in a sweep. The Athletics defeated the Orioles in 5 games to advance to the World Series for the second year in a row (in the process denying a rematch of the 1969 World Series).

Jim Palmer pitched a five-hit complete game shutout as the Orioles took Game 1. Rollie Fingers helped secure Game 2 for the Athletics by holding off a potential rally by the O's. In Oakland, the Athletics prevailed in an ugly extra-inning Game 3 as Bert Campaneris hit a walk-off home run in the bottom of the eleventh. In Game 4, the Orioles came back from a 4-0 deficit late to force a fifth game. However, Catfish Hunter pitched a complete game shutout as the Athletics won 3-0 to secure the pennant.

Both teams would meet one more time in the ALCS the next year, which the Athletics won in four games.

National League Championship Series

New York Mets vs. Cincinnati Reds

This was the only NLCS between 1970 and 1980 not to feature either the Philadelphia Phillies or the Pittsburgh Pirates.

In one of the most shocking upsets in MLB history, the 82-win Mets defeated the defending National League champion Reds in 5 games to advance to the World Series for the second time in five years. 

The Reds narrowly took Game 1 thanks to a walk-off home run from catcher Johnny Bench. In Game 2, the Mets shut out the Reds by a 5-0 score off a two-hit complete game performance from Jon Matlack to even the series. When the series shifted to Queens for Game 3, it was then marred by a fight that broke out in the fifth inning, beginning with a tussle between Cincinnati's Pete Rose and New York's Bud Harrelson at second base. Players from both sides joined in a brawl that lasted for several minutes and set off rowdy fan behavior at Shea Stadium. Photographs of the fight, autographed by Rose and Harrelson, are now available at a number of Internet sites. The Mets blew out the Reds by a 9-2 score to take a 2-1 series lead. The Reds prevailed in a 12-inning Game 4, thanks to a solo home run from Rose in the top of the twelfth. In Game 5, the Reds tied the game at two in the top of the fifth, but the Mets would put up four unanswered runs off four hits in the bottom of the inning to take the lead for good, and put up one more in the bottom of the sixth. The Mets' 82-wins were the lowest of any pennant winner in MLB history.

The Reds would return to the NLCS in 1975, where they swept the Pittsburgh Pirates en route to a World Series title. This was the last time that the Mets won the NL pennant until 1986, where they defeated the Houston Astros in six games en route to their next World Series title.

1973 World Series

Oakland Athletics (AL) vs. New York Mets (NL) 

This was the second World Series appearance for the Mets. They last went to the World Series in 1969, where they upset the Baltimore Orioles in five games. The Athletics had made their second straight World Series appearance. The previous year, the Athletics fended off a late comeback by the Cincinnati Reds to win the title in seven games.

The Athletics defeated the Mets in seven games to win their second straight World Series title and seventh overall. Game 1 was a pitchers' duel between Oakland's Ken Holtzman and New York's Jon Matlack, which was won by the former as the Athletics prevailed by a 2-1 score. Game 2 was an offensive duel which went into extra innings - the game remained tied at six until the top of the twelfth, when the Mets put up four runs to take the lead for good. The Athletics put up one more run in the bottom of the twelfth, but could manage no more as George Stone earned a save and helped the Mets even the series headed home to Queens. Game 3 went into extra innings yet again, but this time the Athletics would prevail as Bert Campaneris scored Ted Kubiak with a go-ahead RBI single in the top of the eleventh. In Game 4, the Mets jumped out to a big lead early and did not relinquish it, as Matlack held the Athletics' offense to just one run scored after eight innings, evening the series at two games each. Jerry Koosman and Tug McGraw helped the Mets shutout the Athletics in Game 5 to take a 3-2 series lead headed back to Oakland, now one win away from pulling off an even bigger upset than what they accomplished in 1969. However, their lead would not hold. Catfish Hunter outdueled the Mets' Tom Seaver as the Athletics won Game 6 by a 3-1 score, forcing a seventh game. Game 7 was yet another pitcher's duel between Holtzman and Matlack, who were both on three-days rest, and once again Holtzman prevailed as he and closer Darold Knowles helped the Athletics win by a 5-2 score to repeat as World Series champions.

The Athletics would successfully pull off a three-peat the next year against a fellow California rival in the Los Angeles Dodgers. The Mets would not return to the World Series again until 1986, where they defeated the Boston Red Sox in seven games.

References

External links
 League Baseball Standings & Expanded Standings - 1973

 
Major League Baseball postseason